Jean Simon, anglicized as John Simon (also spelled Simons; c. 1675–1751) was an English mezzotint engraver and print publisher of French Huguenot birth, particularly known for his portraits. Notably associated with the German-born portrait painter Godfrey Kneller, Simon had an active career that spanned at least three and a half decades, and was regarded as one of the mezzotint medium's most prolific masters of his generation, along with the older contemporaneous engraver John Smith.

Life
Born Jean Simon c. 1675 in Normandy, he was said to belong to a Huguenot artist family that was connected to the protestant church at Charenton-le-Pont near Paris. In Paris, he studied line engraving. Early in the 18th century, Simon moved to London and began working in mezzotint, quickly adapting to the market demands; his earliest known prints were published from Cross Lane, Long Acre, during the middle years of Queen Anne's reign. In c. 1708–1709, Simon gained the attention of Godfrey Kneller, who fell out with his principal engraver, John Smith. Until the dispute with Smith was settled, Simon obtained several of Kneller's commissions. This assured Simon's reputation, allowing him to become a founding member of the Academy for Artists in Great Queen Street, set up under Kneller's patronage in 1711. In his notebooks, George Vertue listed Simon among leading mezzotint engravers working in London, along with Smith, John Faber the Elder, John Faber the Younger, and George White; from Vertue's notebooks, it is also known that Simon was an associate of the renowned Rose and Crown Club.

From early in his career, Simon began working extensively for the prominent print seller Edward Cooper (–1725). Particularly noted was a c. 1707–1710 publication by Cooper of a set of mezzotints by Simon after the Raphael Cartoons in Hampton Court Palace, devoted to the 2nd Duke of Devonshire. After Cooper's death in 1725, Simon succeeded him as chief publisher of Michael Dahl's paintings. Beside from Cooper, Simon was employed by such notable publishers as Thomas Bowles II (c. 1689–1767) and John Overton (c. 1639–1713); since c. 1720, he mostly published his own prints from a series of addresses around Covent Garden. After at least three and a half decades, Simon retired from active printmaking c. 1742, nine year before his death on 22 September 1751; his remaining stock of plates was sold in November 1761.

Work
Simon was a prolific printmaker, particularly noted for portraits made after Kneller, Dahl, Thomas Gibson, Thomas Murray, Philippe Mercier, Enoch Seeman, and others. Subjects of Simon's portraits represented all points of the political spectrum, including the Duke of Marlbourough, Robert Walpole, Francis Atterbury, Lord North and Grey, the 10th Earl Marischal, and the Duke of Ormond; similarly, portraits of members of the then reigning House of Hanover were balanced by those of exiled members of the House of Stuart. Simon also engraved sets of the Four Mohawk Kings after John Verelst, published in 1710, and of twenty-four Poets and Philosophers of England published on six plates c. 1727. Aside from portraiture, Simon took biblical, historical, and decorative subjects; alongside the Raphael Cartoons, these include Christ Restoring the Blind Man's Sight by Louis Laguerre, Four Elements by Jacopo Amigoni, Four Seasons by Rosalba Carriera. He was also known to make prints after Antoine Watteau, Jean-Baptiste-Siméon Chardin, Peter Paul Rubens, Federico Barocci, Sébastien Leclerc, and others. There are mezzotints by Simon made likely of his own invention, or after that by unknown authors; these include a portrait of the Russian statesman Alexander Danilovich, Prince Menshikov; The Judgment of Paris, a mythological subject; and A Winter Evening's Conversation, a satyrical print.

According to later authors, Simon had a "spare and powerful" style influenced by that of Smith, yet contrasting with the latter, including cases the both worked after the same original. In comparison to Smith, Simon was known to use a less close grounding of plates, with laying small cross-hatched lines; In that relation, Simon's skill was regarded as inferior to Smith's in technical terms such as brightance, drawing of the figures, and details; nonetheless, Simon closely rivaled Smith in his finest works. In spite of aforementioned issues, Simon's prints were esteemed among "the most successful mezzotints of their day". In the 20th century, the English authors Malcolm Charles Salaman and the 3rd Baron Killanin credited Simon for bringing a "fresh artistic sensitiveness" and, overall, a French influence into the mezzotint medium, respectively. Peter Pelham, a pioneering American painter and mezzotint engraver, was an apprentice of Simon in London.

Gallery

Notes

References

Sources

External links 

 John Simon at the National Portrait Gallery official website
 John Simon at the British Museum official website

1675 births
1751 deaths
17th-century engravers
18th-century engravers
French engravers
English engravers
Huguenots